Panaon Island is a small island in the Philippines, in the province of Southern Leyte. It lies south of Leyte, separated from Dinagat to the east, and Mindanao to the southeast by Surigao Strait. The Mindanao Sea lies to the southwest.

The largest town is Liloan, which is connected by a bridge called the Wawa Bridge to the main Leyte Island.

Panaon Island is composed of the municipalities of Liloan, San Francisco, Pintuyan and San Ricardo. The basic forms of living are harvesting coconut, rice, fish and edible green leaves.

Scuba diving and whale watching (referred to locally as Tikitiki) are popular tourist activities.

External links
 Panaon Island at OpenStreetMap

Islands of Southern Leyte